Donell James "D. J." Alexander (born Donell James Welch; September 30, 1991) is a former American football linebacker. He was drafted by the Kansas City Chiefs in the fifth round of the 2015 NFL Draft. He played college football for Oregon State.

College career
Alexander was recruited to Oregon State and grayshirted his freshman year to focus on academics. He ended up becoming a three-year starter for the Beavers. He was frequently injured as a junior and underwent a neck surgery after the season. Alexander enjoyed a bounce-back senior year, recording 70 tackles with 12 tackles for loss and four sacks in 2014

Professional career

Kansas City Chiefs
Alexander was drafted in the fifth round with the 172nd pick of the 2015 NFL draft by the Kansas City Chiefs despite not being invited to the NFL combine. A good showing at Oregon State pro day prompted the Chiefs to select him.

As a rookie in 2015, Alexander played all 16 games making 16 tackles and a forced fumble.

Having little expectations at regular snaps, Alexander performed better at special teams. He finished the 2016 year by playing 16 games with one start. He was named to his first Pro Bowl as a special teamer.

Seattle Seahawks
On July 28, 2017, Alexander was traded to the Seattle Seahawks in exchange for Kevin Pierre-Louis.

On September 1, 2018, Alexander was waived by the Seahawks.

Philadelphia Eagles
On September 2, 2018, Alexander was claimed off waivers by the Philadelphia Eagles.

Jacksonville Jaguars
On May 1, 2019, Alexander signed with the Jacksonville Jaguars. He was placed on injured reserve on October 22, 2019 with a foot injury.

Personal life
In 2012, he legally changed his last name from Welch to Alexander, in honor of his stepfather.

References

External links
 Oregon State Beavers bio

1991 births
Living people
American Conference Pro Bowl players
American football outside linebackers
Jacksonville Jaguars players
Kansas City Chiefs players
Oregon State Beavers football players
People from Palm Desert, California
Philadelphia Eagles players
Players of American football from California
Seattle Seahawks players
Sportspeople from Riverside County, California